Mohammed Gul is a citizen of Pakistan, who is alleged to be a Taliban leader.
When Nek Mohammed Wazir was killed by a missile strike from a Predator drone in June 2004, 
Pakistan's Dawn said he had initially been recruited into the Taliban by a Mohammed Gul, a "former Afghan Mujahid".  According to Dawn he is a "Kharoti tribesman from southern Afghanistan", who lived in a refugee camp near Wana.

In 2006 the New York Sun said Pakistani authorities in Waziristan had released Mohammad Gul
as part of a good will gesture.
They described him as "a relative of Faqir Mohammed", and a "militant leader sought by security agencies for allegedly aiding remnants of the Taliban and Al Qaeda'".

References

Pashtun people
Afghan people of Pakistani descent
Taliban leaders
People from South Waziristan
Living people
Year of birth missing (living people)